45 Minutes from Broadway is a 1920 American silent comedy film directed by Joseph De Grasse and starring Charles Ray, Dorothy Devore and Eugenie Besserer. It was based on the 1906 play of the same title by George M. Cohan.

Cast
 Charles Ray as Kid Burns
 Dorothy Devore as 	Mary Jane Jenkins
 Hazel Howell as Flora Dora Dean
 Eugenie Besserer as Mrs. David Dean
 May Foster as Mrs. Purdy
 Donald MacDonald as 	Tom Bennett
 Harry Myers as 	Daniel Cronin
 William Courtright as Andy Gray

References

Bibliography
 Connelly, Robert B. The Silents: Silent Feature Films, 1910-36, Volume 40, Issue 2. December Press, 1998.

External links
 

1920s American films
1920 films
1920 comedy films
1920s English-language films
American silent feature films
American comedy films
American black-and-white films
Films directed by Joseph De Grasse
First National Pictures films
American films based on plays
Silent American comedy films